XBL may refer to:

 Exploits Block List, a blacklist maintained by The Spamhaus Project
 The Exclusive Bus Lane in the Lincoln Tunnel
 Xbox Live, an online multiplayer gaming and digital media delivery service created and operated by Microsoft Corporation
 XML Binding Language, a markup language developed by the Mozilla project